Peter Maxwell Davies, an English composer and conductor, wrote music in many genres, notably ten symphonies and works for the stage, from the monodrama Eight Songs for a Mad King (first performed in 1969) to The Hogboon (scheduled to be performed in June 2016).

His official catalogue includes more than 334 works starting with his Op. 1 in 1955, but there are also about fifty earlier works dating back as far as 1942—regarded as juvenilia—and around a hundred minor mature works, designated by "WoO" (Werke ohne Opuszahl = Works without Opus number). These numbers were not assigned by the composer, but rather were first established only in 2010.

He sometimes based his music on Mediaeval and Renaissance motifs and themes such as the opera Taverner, on the composer John Taverner. After his move to Orkney, he often used Orcadian themes, for example in An Orkney Wedding, with Sunrise for orchestra with bagpipes. Interested in classical forms, he composed series and cycles of works. The first seven of his ten symphonies form a cycle. He composed several concertos, including a Trumpet Concerto and a series of ten Strathclyde Concertos for different instruments, sometimes in combination. Of his fourteen string quartets, ten form a series,  the Naxos Quartets which can be considered a multi-installment "novel."

Table of selected compositions 
This incomplete table of compositions by Peter Maxwell Davies lists notable works chronologically, adding when available subtitle or full title, scoring, Opus number (Op.), year of composition, genre, text information, and the link to the details on the official website. The title is sometimes a common title, with a subtitle added in the same column, while other details such as a full title or a description appear in the second column. The scoring is given if it is not obvious from the title, or unexpected, such as the tenth symphony which includes vocal parts. A year of composition follows, according to the website. The year of a first performance may be different. The column "Text" lists texts on which the work is based, or their author(s).

References

External links 
 

Davies, Peter Maxwell, compositions by